Yindi may refer to:

 Yothu Yindi, an Australian musical group.
 Emperor Yin (disambiguation) (隱帝; Yindi), a posthumous name for some Chinese emperors